The 36th Hundred Flowers Awards was held on 30 July, 2022 in Wuhan, Hubei, China.

Winners and nominees

References 

2022
H